Ekannoborti is 2021 Indian Bengali-language drama film co-written and directed by Mainak Bhaumik. It is produced by Shrikant Mohta and Mahendra Soni under the banner of Shree Venkatesh Films. It stars Aparajita Adhya, Sauraseni Maitra, Ananya Sen and Alakananda Ray. The film had a theatrical release on 19 November 2021.

Cast
 Aparajita Adhya as Malini Chatterjee: Sujan's Wife, Shila and Pinky's mother
 Sauraseni Maitra as Shila Chatterjee: Sujan and Malini's elder daughter, Pinky's elder sister
 Ananya Sen as Pinky Chatterjee: Sujan and Malini's younger daughter, Shila's younger sister
 Alakananda Ray as Malini's mother, Shila and Pinky's grandmother
 Kaushik Sen as Abhradeep Dutta: director of web series
 Sandipta Sen 
 Gourab Roychoudhury as Animesh: Shila's childhood friend
 Ravi Shaw as Sunny : Shila's boyfriend
 Sudip Mukherjee as Sujan Chatterjee: Malini's husband, Shila and Pinky's father
 Madhurima Ghosh as Jhumpa:

Soundtrack

References

External links
 
Bengali-language Indian films
2021 films
2020s Bengali-language films